John Neilson (1 April 1929 – 22 June 2012) was a Scottish footballer who played for St Mirren in the Scottish Football League. He also represented the Scottish Football League XI four times, played in an unofficial match for the Scotland B team against the 'A' team in 1955, and one full 'B' match against England the following year.

References

External links 

1929 births
2012 deaths
Sportspeople from Midlothian
Association football wing halves
Scottish footballers
Newtongrange Star F.C. players
St Mirren F.C. players
Scottish Football League players
Scottish Football League representative players
Scotland B international footballers
Scottish Junior Football Association players